Opium Den may refer to:

Opium den, an establishment, common in the 19th century, where opium was sold and smoked
Opium Den (band), a 1990s American gothic rock band
The Opium Den, a 1947 Italian crime film